Celsius is the codename for a GPU microarchitecture developed by Nvidia, and released in 1999, as the successor to Fahrenheit (NV4, NV3...) microarchitecture. It was named with reference to Celsius and used with the GeForce 256 and GeForce 2 series.

Graphics features 
 DirectX 7.0
 OpenGL 1.2 (1.5)
 Max VRAM size bumped to 128MB

Chips

GeForce 256 

 NV10, 17 million transistor

GeForce 2 series 

 NV11, 20 million transistor
 NV15, 25 million transistor
 NV17, 29 million transistor
 NV18, 29 million transistor
 Crush11, 20 million transistor
 Crush17, 29 million transistor

GPU list

GeForce 256

GeForce 2 series

See also 
 List of Nvidia graphics processing units
 Scalable Link Interface (SLI)
 Qualcomm Adreno

References

External links 

GPGPU
Nvidia Curie
Nvidia microarchitectures
Parallel computing
Graphics cards